Shaukat Fayyaz Ahmed Tarin (born 1 January 1953) is a Pakistani politician and banker who served as Finance Minister of Pakistan from 2008 to 2010 in the Gillani cabinet also and worked with the help of the Pakistan People’s Party's cabinet members. On 27 December 2021, he was appointed the Finance Minister of Pakistan again, replacing the recently appointed Hammad Azhar after a cabinet reshuffle by Prime Minister of Islamic Republic of Pakistan Imran Khan. He is the Member of the Senate of Pakistan since March 2018.

On 7 October 2008, he was appointed an adviser to the government and was elevated to the post of finance minister after being elected as a senator from Sindh on 27 July 2009. Tarin resigned from the ministry on 23 February 2010 to "raise equity from the market for Silkbank," which while working at finance ministry was "a clear conflict of interest."

Before his ministerial role, Tarin served as the country manager of Citibank and did tenures as head of Habib Bank, Union Bank, and twice as chairman of Karachi Stock Exchange. He currently sits on the board of Silkbank.

On 17 October 2021, he was appointed Advisor to Prime Minister on Finance and Revenue. He served as federal minister for finance and revenue till 17 October 2021 because he was unable to be elected as senator.

His name appeared in the Pandora Papers.

Banking career
Tarin is an ethnic Pashtun born to an army doctor in Multan. He got his initial education from Army Cantonment schools all over Pakistan and later got his MBA from University of the Punjab. He joined Citibank in 1975 and remained with it for 22 years rising to become its country manager in Thailand.

In 1997, then-PM Nawaz Sharif asked Tarin to turn around state-owned Habib Bank, for which he left the $1 million plus job in the United States. He, along with Zubyr Soomro at United Bank and Muhammad Mian Soomro at National Bank of Pakistan, were "successful in bringing the nationalised commercial banks (NCBs) back from virtual extinction."

He left HBL in 2000 to join Union Bank as its president. As the president of the Union Bank, Tarin was associated with the acquisition by Standard Chartered Bank of a 95.37% interest in Union Bank in September 2006. The amount paid was $487 million, in cash.

Shaukat Tarin has also been elected twice as chairman of Karachi Stock Exchange (KSE), the last one being in the year 2008.

Shaukat Tarin was a major stakeholder of Saudi Pak Commercial Bank (SPCB) and formed a consortium, along with senior banker Sadeq Sayeed, International Finance Corporation (IFC), BankMuscat, Nomura Holdings and Sinthos Capital to acquire an 86.55% stake in SPCB from Saudi Pak Industrial And Agricultural Investment Co. Ltd. for $213 million in cash on 31 March 2008. Subsequently, Saudi Pak was rebranded as Silkbank Limited on 1 June 2009 with a strategic focus on SME & Consumer financing for increased profitability.

Political career
Shaukat Tarin was appointed adviser to the finance ministry of Pakistan with a status of federal minister, on 7 October 2008. Prior to this appointment, Tarin was serving as the President of Saudi-Pak Commercial Bank (presently, Silk Bank). On 27 July 2009, he was elected senator unopposed from Sindh and subsequently, he was elevated to finance minister of Pakistan. As such, he heads the Executive Committee of the National Economic Council (NEC) and the Economic Coordination Committee (ECC).

Tarin resigned from the ministry on 23 February 2010 to "raise equity from the market for Silkbank," which while working at finance ministry was "a clear conflict of interest."

He was appointed Federal Minister for finance and revenue affairs on 16 April 2021.

On 20 December 2021, Tarin was elected as a senator from Khyber Pakhtunkhwa.

On 27 December 2021, he took oath as Federal Minister of Finance and Revenue.

Member of Finance Committee
Shaukat Tarin is a member of the economic and finance committee since 18 April 2019 by Prime Minister Imran Khan. Shaukat Tarin is the convener of the committee to the Prime Minister. This committee will help the finance minister to stabilize the economy and will give their recommendations directly to Prime Minister Imran Khan.

See also
 Silkbank Limited

References

External links

 Silkbank

1953 births
Living people
Finance Ministers of Pakistan
Pakistani bankers
Pakistani economists
People from Multan
Forman Christian College alumni
Pakistani expatriates in Thailand
University of the Punjab alumni
Citigroup people
Pakistanis named in the Pandora Papers